Miriam Paris (born June 30, 1960) is an American politician who has served in the Georgia House of Representatives from the 142nd district since 2017. She previously served in the Georgia State Senate from the 26th district from 2011 to 2013.

References

1960 births
Living people
People from Macon, Georgia
21st-century American politicians
21st-century American women politicians
Democratic Party Georgia (U.S. state) state senators
Democratic Party members of the Georgia House of Representatives